Seble Wongel (died 4 December 1567) was Empress of Ethiopia through her marriage to Lebna Dengel. She is well-known as a key political and military figure during the Ethiopian–Adal war, as well as the reigns of her sons and grandson.

Name
Seble Wongel is frequently confused with the 20th-century noblewoman, Sabla Wangel Hailu. To differentiate the two famous women, people sometimes refer to the earlier empress as Seble Wongel 'Teleq' (the great) or 'Kedamawit' (the first), while the modern figure is referred to with the suffixes Hailu, derived from her father's name, Dagmawit (the second), or Tinishi (the little).

Life
Seble Wongel was born from the Jewish nobility of Semien and her mother was named Yodit which literally means 'Jewess' or 'Judith'. Chronicles written in the 16th century imply that she was neither a member of the traditional nobility nor any group integrated with the Christian kingdom under the authority of the Ethiopian Emperor, meaning that her marriage was a major dynastic and political alliance. By contrast with previous emperors, Seble Wongel was the only wife, which won Lebna Dengel praise from contemporary Christian writers.

Popular tradition from the 18th century onwards holds that she came from Gojjam, though this association with the region may stem from the fact that she later settled there. The 20th-century record The Goggam Chronicle by Aleqa Tekle Iyesus suggests that Seble Wongel was a descendant of Ğara Šum from Enemay. While it is not clear if Seble Wongel actually came from Gojjam, it has been suggested that these later claims do not contradict 16th-century chronicles that record Seble Wongel as coming from outside the Ethiopian realm of direct control, as Gojjam enjoyed a high degree of autonomy at the time, and possibly not all of the area was Christian.

The Queen was described as being "Very beautiful".

Ethiopian–Adal War

The reign of Lebna Dengel and his successor Gelawdewos were marked by wars between the Ethiopian Empire and the muslim Adal Sultanate. From 1529 to 1543, the Adal swept through Ethiopian lands, leading almost to the destruction of the state.

In 1539, Seble Wongel's mother was killed when the Adal attacked the region, and the eldest of Seble Wongel's sons, Fiqtor, was killed in battle by the forces of Garad Uthman. The same year, another son, Menas was captured by Imam Ahmed.

In 1542, Portuguese forces fought and defeated the Muslim Ottoman-Adal army several times before suffering a defeat against the much larger army of Imam Ahmad of the Adal Sultanate who was supported by thousands of Ottoman musketeers. After this defeat, 120 Portuguese soldiers fled with Seble Wongel to the region of Tigray. 

Gelawdewos originally left Semien while liberating shewa but rejoined his mother  in October 1542. He then marched to Tigray and collected the remaining 120 Portuguese troops. Starting from 17 November 1542, Gelawdewos' combined Abyssinian-Portuguese forces defeated the Adal-Ottoman armies several times and killed several key leaders before finally killing Imam Ahmed and subsequently routing the Muslim army at the Wayna Daga on 21 February 1543. Imam Ahmed's wife, Bati del Wambara, escaped with 40 Turkish soldiers and 300 horsemen.

The eldest son of Bati del Wambara and Imam Ahmed was captured at Wayna Daga, and Seble Wongel used him to barter for the life of her son Menas, who had been held captive by the Adal for five years. Through her influence, as well as that of Bati del Wambara, a prisoner exchange was conducted, and Menas was returned to Ethiopia.

Menas' reign
Menas established the kingdom's base in the region of Mengiste Semayat, and Seble Wongel left with him in 1559. By 1563, Seble Wongel had made her official residence in this region at Kidane Mehret church.

Family
Husband: Lebna Dengel (1496 – 2 September 1540) 
Fiqtor (d. 1539)
Yaqob (d. 1558)
Fasilides
Susenyos I (1572 – 17 September 1632)
Lesana Krestos
Za Dengel (d. 24 October 1604)
Menas (d. 1563)
Sarsa Dengel (1550 – 4 October 1597)
Gelawdewos (c. 1521 – 23 March 1559)
Amata-Giyorgis
Sabana-Giyorgis
Welette-Qiddusan
Taodra, or possibly Theodora

In popular culture
 Seble Wongel appears in Age of Empires III: Definitive Edition, in the historical battle "Christopher da Gama's Expedition" based on the Ethiopian-Adal War, incorrectly called Sabla Wengel in-game.

Notes

References

Date of birth unknown
1567 deaths
Empresses and imperial consorts of Ethiopia
Solomonic dynasty
1530s in Ethiopia
1540s in Ethiopia
Ethiopian women in politics
African women in war
Women in 16th-century warfare